The Conqueror-class ships of the line were a class of two 101-gun first rate screw propelled ships designed by the Surveyor’s Department for the Royal Navy.

Design
The Conqueror class ships were designed in 1852 as two-decker 101-gun first rates in a period when many under-construction sail ships of the line were being redesigned to use screw propulsion in addition to sail.

Careers
Both ships saw service in the Channel Squadron, and later in the Crimean War. Both were used to transport troops to Mexico in support of the French intervention there in 1861. HMS Conqueror was wrecked on Rum Cay whilst carrying this out, but without losses, and most of her machinery, guns and stores were subsequently salvaged. HMS Donegal continued in service as a guard ship, in which role she took the last surrender of the American Civil War. She was hulked in 1886, and became part of the torpedo training school . She served until the establishment moved on shore in 1923, and was broken up in 1925.

Ships

Builder: Devonport Dockyard
Ordered: 16 November 1852
Laid down: 25 July 1853
Launched: 2 May 1855
Completed: 9 April 1856
Fate: Wrecked at Rum Cay on 13 December 1861

Builder: Devonport Dockyard
Ordered: 27 December 1854
Laid down: 27 September 1855
Launched: 23 September 1858
Completed: 27 August 1859
Fate: Renamed  on 14 January 1886. Sold for breaking up on 18 May 1925

Notes

References

 Lyon, David and Winfield, Rif, The Sail and Steam Navy List, All the Ships of the Royal Navy 1815-1889, pub Chatham, 2004,

External links

 
Ship of the line classes
Ship classes of the Royal Navy